Spanish personal pronouns have distinct forms according to whether they stand for the subject (nominative) or object, and third-person pronouns make an additional distinction for direct object (accusative) or indirect object (dative), and for reflexivity as well. Several pronouns also have special forms used after prepositions.

Spanish is a pro-drop language with respect to subject pronouns, and, like many European languages, Spanish makes a T-V distinction in second person pronouns that has no equivalent in modern English. Object pronouns can be both clitic and non-clitic, with non-clitic forms carrying greater emphasis.  With clitic pronouns, proclitic forms are much more common, but enclitic forms are mandatory in certain situations. There is significant regional variation in the use of personal pronouns, especially second-person pronouns.

Table of personal pronouns
All the personal pronouns used in Spanish are outlined in the table below. Ladino, historically spoken by Sephardic Jews, employs some personal pronouns that have fallen out of use in Spanish.

1 Only in countries with voseo; Ladino has vos as the formal form, instead of usted.
2 Primarily in Spain; elsewhere, ustedes is used in the plural regardless of the level of formality.
3 Reflexive
Usted may be abbreviated as Ud. or Vd.

Subject pronouns

Pronoun dropping and grammatical gender
Spanish is a pro-drop language with respect to subject pronouns. Information contained in verb endings often renders the explicit use of subject pronouns unnecessary and even erroneous although they may still be used for clarity or emphasis:
 Yo hago or just Hago = "I do"
 Ellos vieron or just Vieron = "They saw"

English subject pronouns are generally not translated into Spanish if neither clarity nor emphasis is an issue. "I think" is generally translated as just Creo unless the speaker contrasts their views with those of someone else or places emphasis on the fact that their views are their own and not somebody else's.

Third-person masculine and feminine pronouns (él, ella, ellos, and ellas) can refer to grammatically masculine and feminine objects as well as people, but their explicit use as subjects is somewhat uncommon, and restricted to people. The third-person neuter singular pronoun ello is likewise rarely used as an explicit subject in everyday language, although such usage is found in formal and literary contexts. Quite unusually among European languages, the first- and second-person plural subject pronouns (nosotros/nosotras and vosotros/vosotras, respectively) inflect for gender: nosotros and vosotros are used to refer to groups of men (as well as men and women), while nosotras and vosotras are used exclusively to refer to groups of women.

Tú/vos and usted
Like French and other languages with the T-V distinction, modern Spanish has a distinction in its second-person pronouns that has no equivalent in modern English. The appropriate usage of those forms is fundamental to interpersonal communication.

Using the  form to address someone implies that the person addressed is a social superior, someone to whom respect is owed, or someone with whom one does not have a close relationship.
Usage changed in the 20th century in Spain, and a woman who addressed her mother as  using  could experience that her children call her  and use . Also, in Spain the Falangists and the Communists promoted the tuteo as a sign of worker solidarity.

Spanish has a verb, meaning to use the familiar form  to address a person. In Anglophone countries, that would be roughly analogous to asking if it is acceptable to call someone by their first name.

The distinction extends to other types of pronouns and modifiers: when using  one must also use the third-person object pronouns and possessive adjectives. "" ( with an (acute) accent is the subject pronoun,  with no accent is a possessive adjective) means "your house" in the familiar singular: the owner of the house is one person, and it is a person with whom one has the closer relationship the  form implies.

Similarly, the use of  requires third-person object pronouns except in some Andalusian dialects.  means "you [familiar singular] wash yourself", but  can mean "you [polite singular] wash yourself" as well as "he/she/it washes himself/herself/itself"'.

Impersonal pronouns
There are several impersonal pronouns in Spanish:
 uno ("one", as well as una for women), which declines as a normal third-person pronoun and is treated as such for purposes of conjugation and reflexivity.
 Many ideas that would be expressed with an impersonal pronoun in English would more often be expressed with so-called pasiva refleja (passive reflexive) constructions in Spanish: "That is not done" (Eso no se hace), rather than "You (One) wouldn't do that" (Uno no hace eso).
 Impersonal tú might be a recent phenomenon. It is conjugated with the second-person but is not directed to the listener. According to one scholar, it might have appeared in the Valencian Community around the 1940s. It is used very often in speech in Spain:

Reflexive pronouns and intensifiers

The third person is the only person with a distinct reflexive pronoun: se.  In the first and second persons, the normal object pronouns are used. Thus, the reflexive forms are:

The reflexive pronoun is used with pronominal verbs, also known as reflexive verbs. These verbs require the use of the reflexive pronoun, appropriate to the subject. Some transitive verbs can take on a reflexive meaning, such as lavar (to wash) and lavarse (to wash oneself).  Other verbs have reflexive forms which do not take on a reflexive meaning, such as ir (to go) and irse (to go away).  Some verbs only have reflexive forms, such as jactarse (to boast).

The nominal intensifier in Spanish (equivalent to English "myself", "yourself", "themselves", etc. when used after a noun) is mismo, which in this case is placed after the noun it modifies and behaves like a normal adjective. Thus:
 Yo mismo lo hice = "I [masc.] myself did it"
 No entiendo porque necesitas la cosa misma = "I don't understand why you need the thing itself"
 Dáselo a los hombres mismos = "Give it to the men themselves"
 A nosotros no nos gustan las chicas mismas = "We don't like the girls themselves" (lit. "The girls themselves don't please us")

Unlike English intensifiers, which are often placed several words after the noun they modify (e.g. "I did it myself"), Spanish intensifiers must come immediately after the noun they modify.

Object pronouns

Object pronouns are personal pronouns that take the function of an object in the sentence. Spanish object pronouns may be both clitic and non-clitic; the clitic form is the unstressed form, and the non-clitic form, which is formed with the preposition a ("to") and the prepositional case, is the stressed form. Clitics cannot function independently and must attach to a host (either a verb or preposition).  Clitic pronouns are generally proclitic, i.e. they appear before the verb of which they are the object. Enclitic pronouns (i.e. pronouns attached to the end of the verb (or related word) itself) most often appear with positive imperatives and may appear with infinitives and gerunds as well. In all compound infinitives that make use of the past participle, enclitics attach to the uninflected auxiliary verb and not the past participle(s) itself.

In Spanish, two (and rarely three) clitic pronouns can be used with a single verb, generally one accusative and one dative. They follow a specific order based primarily on person:

Thus:
 Él me lo dio = "He gave it to me"
 Ellos te lo dijeron = "They said it to you"
 Yo te me daré = "I will give myself to you"
 Vosotros os nos mostráis = "You [pl.] are showing yourselves to us"
 Se le perdieron los libros = "The books disappeared on him" (lit. "The books got lost to him")

The full and pronominal form of a reduplicated direct object must agree in gender and number:
 A las tropas las dirige César. = "Caesar directs the troops."

When an accusative third-person non-reflexive pronoun (lo, la, los, or las) is used with a dative pronoun that is understood to also be third-person non-reflexive (le or les), the dative pronoun is replaced by se. Simple non-emphatic clitic doubling is most often found with dative clitics, although it is occasionally found with accusative clitics as well. In a wide area in central Spain, including Madrid, there exists the practice of leísmo; which is, using the indirect object pronoun le for the object pronoun where Standard Spanish would use lo (masculine) or la (feminine) for the object pronoun.

Genitive pronouns
Genitive pronouns describe to whom something belongs or of whom (or sometimes what) something is a characteristic or property. They are analogous to English "mine", "yours", "his", "hers", etc., and unlike their English counterparts, they inflect for gender and number according to the thing possessed (not the possessor itself) and are generally used with the definite article:
 Mi coche es más grande que el tuyo = "My car is bigger than yours"
 Tu casa tiene más cuartos que la suya = "Your house has more rooms than his/hers/yours/theirs"
 Estos libros son más interesantes que los vuestros = "These books are more interesting than yours [pl.]"
 Esas camisas son más pequeñas que las nuestras = "Those shirts are smaller than ours"

After ser, however, the definite article is usually omitted:
 Este coche es mío = "This car is mine"
 Esta camisa es suya = "This shirt is his/hers/yours/theirs"

To avoid ambiguity in the meaning of suyo, it may be replaced by de + the appropriate pronoun:
 Estos pantalones son más largos que los de él = "These pants are longer than his"
 Esta camisa es de ella = "This shirt is hers"

The neuter article lo can also be used with genitive pronouns to express the concept of "what is mine", "what is yours", "what is his", etc.: lo mío, lo tuyo, lo suyo, etc.

Genitive pronouns are identical in form to long-form possessive adjectives, which may be placed after the noun to place emphasis on the fact of possession.

Old forms

Formal vos 
The pronoun vos was once used as a respectful form of address, semantically equivalent to modern usted. It used the same conjugations as modern vosotros (see below) and also the oblique form os and the possessive vuestro/-a/-os/-as. However, unlike vosotros, which always refers to more than one person, vos was usually singular in meaning. The modern voseo of several countries (see below) derives from vos but has become a generic form of address instead of a specifically respectful form. Vos and its related forms are still used in literature, cinema, etc., when attempting to depict the language of past centuries.

Regional variation

Voseo 

The pronoun "vos" is used in some areas of Latin America, particularly in Central America, Argentina, Uruguay, Paraguay, Chile, the state of Zulia in Venezuela, and the Andean regions of Colombia, Bolivia, Perú, and Ecuador.  These are all distant from the large Spanish colonial cities, like Mexico City, Cartagena (Colombia), and Lima.

In some areas, like the River Plate region, vos has become the only generic form of address for the second-person singular, that is, it has the same meaning that tú has elsewhere (informal and intimate). In other areas, like Chile, it persists as a fairly stigmatized form alongside the more prestigious tú. In some other areas, it is employed among equals but not for very close people (couples or family) or to inferiors (children, animals etc.), where the pronoun tú would normally be used.

Ladino uses vos as well but uses it as in Old Spanish (see above), that is, as a respectful form of address, equivalent to how usted is used elsewhere. In fact, Ladino does not use usted at all because vos implies the same respect that it once had in Old Spanish. In Ladino, tú is used towards anyone in an informal manner.

In the local Spanish-based creole, Chavacano, the use of vos coexists alongside tú and usted depending on level of intimacy, commonality, and formality.

The use of vusted and vuestra merced 
The variant vusted/vustedes is mostly a regionalism in some countries in South America. It is common in isolated areas of Colombia and Venezuela. Other speakers consider it archaic because it is an older form of a contraction of vuestra merced. In Colombia, it is common for people to use su merced interchangeably with usted. Su merced can be used in the vocative case as well such as when speaking to an older person, as in Su merced, ¿por qué no vienen vusted y sus nietos a mi casa esta tarde?

Vuestra merced (literally "your grace") is the origin of usted, usarcé and similar forms that govern third-person verb forms with a second-person function. They are now confined mostly to period works.

It is unlikely that the similar-sounding Arabic , meaning "professor", was involved in the formation of Spanish usted because of the weakness of the semantic link and the fact that usted is not documented before 1598, over a century after the fall of Moorish Granada.

Use of  
Today, the informal second-person plural pronoun  is widely used by Spaniards except in some southwestern regions and in most of the Canary Islands, where its use is rare.

Throughout Latin America, the second person plural pronoun  is almost always used orally in both formal (singular ) and informal (singular ) contexts. However, "that  is not used in Spanish America is one of the great myths of Spanish language instruction, at least in the U.S." The following quote from Sandino was displayed on a billboard in Nicaragua:

 is not unusual in oratory, legal documents, or other highly formal or archaic contexts.

Creoles 

Forms based on vosotros and vos are used in many Spanish-based creole languages.

In Chavacano, spoken in the Philippines, vo is used alongside tu as a singular second-person pronoun in Zamboangueño, Caviteño, and Ternateño. In Zamboangueño, evos is also used. For the plural, Zamboangueño has vosotros while Caviteño has vusos. Papiamento, spoken in Aruba, Bonaire, and Curaçao, maintains boso (singular) and bosonan (plural). Since it was used with slaves, the forms that seemed disrespectful in the rest of America were common.

Other forms

is the equivalent of I in Caló, where it is concords in first person singular.  In Spanish slang such as Cheli,  ♂ / ♀ can be used as an emphatic I, concording with a third person verb, but its use is receding.

Servidor
,

See also
 Portuguese personal pronouns

Notes

References

Spanish grammar
Pronouns by language
Personal pronouns